Matilda Nana Manye Amissah-Arthur (née Borsah) served as the Second Lady of Ghana from 2012 to 2017. She was married to the late former Vice President of Ghana, Kwesi Amissah-Arthur.

Early life and education 
Her father was the Director of Social Welfare and instrumental in founding Osu Children's Home, an orphanage for homeless children and orphans in Osu, Accra as well as the Borstal Institute for juvenile delinquents in the country. Mrs. Amissah-Arthur attended Mfantsiman Girls' Secondary School in Central Region of Ghana for her secondary school education.

Career 
Amissah-Arthur is a librarian by profession.

Second Lady of Ghana 
As Second Lady, Amissah-Arthur is well known for her role in promoting literacy, digital libraries, and other beneficial causes in Ghana, including donation of medical items, and supporting fishmongers in the town of Effutu. Amissah-Arthur was influenced to do social work by her father, who was once Director of Social Welfare in Ghana and inculcated the habit of selflessness and hardwork in his children. She has been installed as a Queen Mother of Logba-Adzekoe in 2016, with the stool name of Unandze Afan Eshi (Mamaga Afeamenyo I).

Personal life 
She was married to former vice president of Ghana and former governor of the Bank of Ghana, Kwesi Amissah-Arthur and they were blessed with two children until he died on 29 June 2018 at the 37 Military Hospital.

References

Living people
Second ladies of Ghana
African queen mothers
Ghanaian librarians
Ghanaian women librarians
Mfantsiman Girls' Secondary School alumni
Year of birth missing (living people)